is a Japanese football player. He plays for Azul Claro Numazu.

Career
Tomoki Taniguchi joined Japan Football League club Nara Club in 2015. In 2017, he moved to J3 League club Azul Claro Numazu.

References

External links

1992 births
Living people
Ritsumeikan University alumni
Association football people from Kyoto Prefecture
Japanese footballers
J3 League players
Japan Football League players
Nara Club players
Azul Claro Numazu players
Association football midfielders